Ľudovít Zlocha (born 17 May 1945) is Slovak retired international football player. He played 12 matches for Czechoslovakia.

His brother, Ján was also a Czechoslovakia international footballer.

References

External links

Profile at Slovanfutbal.com

1945 births
Living people
Slovak footballers
Czechoslovak footballers
Czechoslovakia international footballers
ŠK Slovan Bratislava players
FK Inter Bratislava players
Association football defenders
Footballers from Bratislava